Sandy Hill may refer to:

Places

Caribbean
 Sandy Hill, Anguilla, a district in Anguilla
 Sandy Hill (Anguilla House of Assembly Constituency)

Canada
 Sandy Hill, Ottawa, a neighborhood in Ottawa, Ontario, Canada
 Champlain, Ontario, a community within the Township of Champlain, Ontario, Canada known as "Sandy Hill"

United States
 Sandy Hill, Paterson, a neighborhood in Paterson, New Jersey, United States
 Sandy Hills, Texas, a settlement in Wilson County, Texas, United States
 Hudson Falls, New York, formerly called Sandy Hill
 Sandy Hill, Maryland, former name of Stockton

People
 Sandy Hill (mountaineer) (born 1955), American mountaineer
 Sandy Hill (television personality) (born 1947), broadcast journalist

See also
 Sandra Hill (disambiguation)